Charalambos John Simopoulos (1874-1942) was a Greek diplomat who was ambassador to the Court of St. James in London at the beginning of the Second World War.

After studying law at the University of Athens, he entered the diplomatic corps in 1901, serving as secretary and dean of the consulates of Alexandria, Mersin, Constantinople. From 1914 to 1919 he was employed at the legations in Paris and Rome. From 1920 to 1921 he was the first ambassador of Greece to Czechoslovakia. In 1922 he was Greek High Commissioner of the Occupation of Constantinople.

On December 12, 1924 he became Minister to Washington, D.C. In 1934 he was appointed Minister to Great Britain, and in May 1942 the Greek legation was raised to the status of an embassy.

His son was the Oxford University academic John Simopoulos.

Simopoulos's funeral was held at St Sophia's Cathedral, Moscow Road, London.

References

1874 births
1942 deaths
Greek diplomats
Ambassadors of Greece to the United States
Ambassadors of Greece to the United Kingdom
Ambassadors to Czechoslovakia
National and Kapodistrian University of Athens alumni
Greek people of World War II